SS Sirdhana was one of the larger S-class passenger ships of the British India Steam Navigation Company. The ship entered service in 1947 and was scrapped in Taiwan in 1972.

References

External links 
 

Ships of the British India Steam Navigation Company
1947 ships